La Marina de Sants or la Marina is an area of the district of Sants-Montjuïc, Barcelona.  This area is divided into two neighborhoods: the lower la Marina de Port and the higher, la Marina del Prat Vermell.

Marina de Sants, la